Aidan Gould (born February 26, 1997) is an American actor. He is the elder brother of actor Nolan Gould.

Family and education
Gould was born in Columbus, Georgia. The family moved to Phenix City, Alabama, when he was very young because his father, an army captain, was stationed at Fort Benning. The family moved to California in 2003.

Career
Like his brother Nolan, Aidan was a child actor. His career began in 2001; at age four he was considered for We Were Soldiers, but instead made his first appearance in a television commercial.

In 2008, he starred in the movie Julia opposite Tilda Swinton. The movie was entered in the 2008 Berlinale; one German critic called Gould's performance "impressive", and another said Gould's performance was "uncannily capable". Matthew Turner of View London called Aidan's performance a "remarkable job", and Amber Wilkinson of Eye for Film remarked, "Gould invests Tom with sufficient reticence."

Filmography
Friday Night Slimetime "Halloween Special" (2005) TV
The Late Late Show with Craig Ferguson (2005) : Telethon Kid
The Red Balloon (2006) Short film : Jimmy
The Secret Life of Leonardo Da Vinci (2006) : Leo as a boy
The McPassion (2006) : Whip and Hammer Boy
National Health Test with Bryant Gumbel (2006) : Christmas Kid (uncredited)
Christmas Spirit (2007) Short film : Danny
Passions (2007) TV : Good Witch Student #1
A New Tomorrow (2007) : Joseph
Gilmore Girls (2007) TV : Kid Sinclair
The Revengers (2007) : Child Tadzio
The Rainbow Tribe (2008) : Josh
Julia (2008) : Tom
CSI: Crime Scene Investigation (2010) TV : Will Sutter
iCarly (2012) TV : Lars
Dynamite Swine (2013) : Young Evan
Workaholics (2013) TV : Chargonius
Modern Family (2013) TV : Drummer

References

External links

1997 births
Living people
American male film actors
American male child actors
American male television actors
Actors from Columbus, Georgia